Megachile pruinosa is a species of bee in the family Megachilidae. It was described by Pérez in 1897.

References

Pruinosa
Insects described in 1897